Ken Ring may refer to:

 Ken Ring (rapper) (born 1979), Swedish hip hop rapper
 Ken Ring (writer), New Zealand weather predictor
 Ken Merckx, a.k.a. Ken Ring, actor
 Kenneth Ring, psychology professor specialising in near-death experiences